The Austrian Individual Speedway Championship is a Motorcycle speedway championship held each year to determine the Austrian national champion.

Winners

See also
 Sport in Austria

References

Speedway competitions in Austria
National speedway championships